In the Latter Day Saint scripture the Book of Abraham, Pharaoh is the proper name of the first king of Egypt.  According to the story, all Egyptians descended from him. He was the eldest son of Egyptus, who was the daughter of Ham and Egyptus. Pharaoh was a descendant of the Canaanites, a race of people who according to Latter Day Saint theology had been cursed with black skin. Leaders of the Church of Jesus Christ of Latter-day Saints (LDS Church) have taught that he inherited the curse of Cain through his grandmother, Egyptus, so that the devil might have representation upon the earth.

Anachronism

The use of the name Pharaoh is considered anachronistic during Abraham's time by virtually all scholars, including LDS Scholars. Most LDS Scholars who adhere to the historicity of the Book of Abraham point to a Jewish redactor who replaced original words with wording that would have been more understandable to his day.

Notes

Pearl of Great Price (Mormonism)
Ham (son of Noah)
Mormonism and race
Book of Abraham
Criticism of Mormonism